The red-eyed dove (Streptopelia semitorquata) is a dove that is a widespread and common in Sub-Saharan Africa. It has been listed as Least Concern on the IUCN Red List since 2004.

Taxonomy
The red-eyed dove was formally described by the German naturalist Eduard Rüppell in 1835 from birds seen in the Taranta Mountains of Eritrea. He coined the binomial name Columba semitorquata. The specific epithet is combines the Latin semi- meaning "half-" or "small" and torquatus meaning "collared". The species is monotypic: no subspecies are recognised.

Description

The red-eyed dove is a largish, stocky pigeon, typically 30 cm (12 inches) in length. Its back, wings and tail are pale brown. When flying, it shows blackish flight feathers. The head and underparts are dark vinous-pink, shading to pale grey on the face. There is a black hind neck patch edged with white. The legs and a patch of bare skin around the eye are red. The call is a loud doo-doo-du-du.

Sexes are similar, but juveniles are duller than adults, and have scalloping on the body feathers.

Red-eyed doves eat grass seeds, grains and other vegetation. They often forage on the ground.

Distribution and habitat
It is distributed through most of Sub-Saharan Africa, except in desert zones. 
It is a common, if not abundant, species in most habitats other than deserts. Like several other species in this genus, they are not particularly gregarious and often feed alone or in pairs. They can be found in forests near rivers.

Behaviour
This species builds a stick nest in a tree and lays two white eggs. Its flight is quick, with the regular beats and an occasional sharp flick of the wings, which are characteristic of pigeons in general.

References

 "Red-eyed dove." Britannica School. Encyclopædia Britannica, Inc., 2015. Web. 1 Oct. 2015.
 Birds of The Gambia by Barlow, Wacher and Disley.

External links
 Red-eyed dove - Species text in The Atlas of Southern African Birds.

red-eyed dove
Birds of Sub-Saharan Africa
red-eyed dove